The yolk-bellied snake-skink (Ophioscincus ophioscincus)  is a species of skink found in Queensland in Australia.

References

Ophioscincus
Reptiles described in 1887
Taxa named by George Albert Boulenger